The 1968 United States presidential election in Nevada took place on November 5, 1968, as part of the 1968 United States presidential election. State voters chose three representatives, or electors, to the Electoral College, who voted for president and vice president.

Background
Since William Jennings Bryan's three elections, Nevada had been a bellwether state voting for every winner since 1912. However, relative to the nation the Silver State had trended Republican since the end of World War II when Populist radicalism gave way to small-town and rural conservatism due to demographic and technological change. Although Democrats had a large advantage in registration, the 1966 midterm elections saw Republican Lieutenant Governor Paul Laxalt take most of the Mormon and Catholic vote in traditionally Democratic Clark County, which was becoming the center of the state's rapid demographic growth. This Republican trend was aided by a fall in demand for construction work in Las Vegas and several major strikes across the state.

In the early stages of the campaign, the Democratic Party viewed Nixon – despite losing strongly Catholic Nevada to Kennedy in 1960 – as much more dangerous in Nevada than Ronald Reagan or George Romney. As a part of his national third party segregationist campaign, former Alabama Governor George Wallace became the first third-party candidate to obtain the necessary eight thousand signatures to get on the ballot in Nevada since the "Progressive Party" in 1948.

Vote
In the earliest polls Nevada's past Republican trend was confirmed, with it being given clearly to Nixon in the second week of September, and confirmed by further polls until the last few days before the election. During this period Humphrey made a brief visit to Nevada and came back substantially nationwide, whilst a strong poll for Wallace made the state doubtful.

Ultimately former Vice President Richard Nixon, with 47.46% of the popular vote, won Nevada more substantially than predicted by the last polls, though by less than thought likely in September and early October. "Independent American" candidate George Wallace finished with 13.25% of the popular vote, close to his national average but his best performance outside the Confederacy and Border States. Wallace's success was largely due to his endorsement by state congressman Walter S. Baring Jr., a conservative "States' Rights Democrat" who consistently managed huge majorities in Nevada's rural 'Cow Counties' (the 14 counties apart from Clark, Washoe, and Carson City).

Nixon had previously lost Nevada in 1960 but would later win it a second time in 1972. Nixon's victory was the first of six consecutive Republican victories in the state, as Nevada would not vote for a Democratic candidate again until Bill Clinton in 1992. Since then it has become a heavily competitive swing state, which now leans Democrat.

Results

Results by county

See also
United States presidential elections in Nevada

Notes

References

Nevada
1968
1968 Nevada elections